BCAS can refer to:
British Compressed Air Society
Bureau of Civil Aviation Security
British Columbia Ambulance Service